The William Dwelley House (also known as the Harry Kaminsky House) is a historic house located in Hudson, Wisconsin. It is locally significant due to its association with William Dwelley and also its incorporation of the Italianate style of architecture.

It is a two-story house on a stone foundation.

It was added to the National Register of Historic Places in 1984.

References

Houses in St. Croix County, Wisconsin
Houses on the National Register of Historic Places in Wisconsin
Italianate architecture in Wisconsin
National Register of Historic Places in St. Croix County, Wisconsin